Kuke may refer to several places in Estonia:
Kuke, Lääne County, village in Lääne-Nigula Parish, Lääne County
Kuke, Pärnu County, village in Lääneranna Parish, Pärnu County
Kuke, Saare County, village in Saaremaa Parish, Saare County